Joachim Kugelmann (born 18 August 1971) is a German motorcycle speedway rider who rode in 2001 Speedway World Cup and 2002 Speedway World Cup.

See also 
 Germany national speedway team

References 

1971 births
Living people
German speedway riders